Lust is the fifth studio album by the German solo artist Michael Rother. It was released in 1983 and includes the single "Palmengarten" b/w "Cascadia".

The album was recorded in 1982 in Germany at Rother's own studio Sterntaler Studio in Forst. Receiving positive reviews the album was released as an LP and Cassette in 1983. The album was reissued on CD in 1994 with bonus tracks and having been remastered.

Recording and music
Lust is the first studio album which Rother recorded without any assistance. Previously albums had utilised Jaki Liebezeit from Can on drums as well as co-production from Conny Plank. The entirety of the album was written and performed by Rother utilising guitar and electronic instrumentation. The studio album was Rother's first with the Fairlight music computer.

Releases
Lust was first released on Polydor Records as an LP and Cassette in 1983. In 1993, Rother secured the rights to his back catalogue and re-issued all of his solo albums with bonus tracks and remastered sound on his own label, Random Records. Lust was re-released under Rother's new arrangement the following year in 1994. In 2000, Rother re-issued all of the albums again in partnership between Random Records and BSC Music. Expanded editions include the 1994-era tracks "Blauer Delphin", "Gitarrero" and "Nachtpassage – Ambient Night Mix".

Reception

Lust received positive reviews by the majority of critics.

Track listing

Personnel
 Michael Rother - Guitar, Keyboards, Fairlight, Bass, Producer

References

1983 albums
Michael Rother albums
Polydor Records albums